Farman Basha (born 25 March 1974) is an Indian powerlifter. Basha represented India at the 2012 Summer Paralympics in London, United Kingdom. He won a bronze medal at the 2010 Asian Para Games in Guangzhou, China. However, this was later upgraded to a silver medal after Iranian Mustafa Radhi was disqualified due to doping.

Personal life
Basha was born on 25 March 1974 in Bangalore, Karnataka, to a middle-class family. He holds a diploma in electronics and television engineering. He is married to Antonita Farman, a general category athlete. Basha is afflicted with poliomyelitis, which he contracted when he was one year old. Due to this permanent physical impairment, he is unable to ambulate and uses calipers and a wheelchair.

Powerlifting
Unaware of Paralympic sports, Basha used to compete in bodybuilding contentions. He started powerlifting after his neighbour introduced him to sport for persons with physical disabilities. The first event he participated in was the 1997 National Wheelchair Games, where he won a silver medal. This achievement encouraged him to "pursue the sport with even greater vigour".

In 1998, Basha won a gold medal and set a new national record in the South Zone selection trials for the 1999 FESPIC Games (Far East and South Pacific Games for the Disabled), held in Bangkok, where he finished seventh overall. He won a gold medal in an event for non-disabled competitors in 2006. This feat "left the Powerlifting Federation of India [Indian Powerlifting Federation] so upset that" the Federation barred disabled athletes from competing in their events. He represented India at the 2006 Commonwealth Games in Melbourne, Australia. He lifted  and finished at tenth spot.

He was awarded with the Arjuna Award in 2008. In 2010, he received the Ekalavya Award – Chief Minister's award for an outstanding sportsperson (for 2008) from the Governor of Karnataka Hansraj Bhardwaj at a ceremony in the Raj Bhavan.

He is sponsored by a company with 5,000–5,500 per month and his wife, Antonita, contributes for rest of the expenditures.

Basha appeared in 4 Paralympic events and finished 10th in 2004, 4th in 2008, 5th in 2012 and 4th in 2016 Paralympics in his category. Though never won a medal, Farman has been a promising Indian athlete in each Paralympic event.

He competed at the 2018 Commonwealth Games where he came 5th in the lightweight event.

References

Living people
Indian powerlifters
Paralympic powerlifters of India
Powerlifters at the 2004 Summer Paralympics
Powerlifters at the 2008 Summer Paralympics
Powerlifters at the 2012 Summer Paralympics
Powerlifters at the 2016 Summer Paralympics
Recipients of the Arjuna Award
1974 births
Sportspeople from Bangalore
Les Autres category Paralympic competitors
Powerlifters at the 2010 Commonwealth Games
Powerlifters at the 2014 Commonwealth Games
Recipients of the Ekalavya Award
Indian male weightlifters
Weightlifters from Karnataka
Commonwealth Games competitors for India
Powerlifters at the 2018 Commonwealth Games